The  is one of eight active brigades of the Japan Ground Self-Defense Force. The brigade is subordinated to the Eastern Army and is headquartered in Shintō, Gunma. Its responsibility is the defense of Gunma, Nagano, Niigata and Tochigi prefectures.

The brigade was formed on 13 March 2001 with units from the disbanded 12th Infantry Division.

Organization 

 12th Brigade, in Shintō
 12th Brigade HQ, in Shintō
 2nd Infantry Regiment note 1, in Jōetsu
 13th Infantry Regiment, in Matsumoto
 30th Infantry Regiment, in Shibata
 12th Artillery Battalion, in Utsunomiya, with four batteries of FH-70 155mm towed howitzers
 12th Reconnaissance Company, in Shintō, with Type 87 armored reconnaissance vehicle
 12th Anti-Aircraft Artillery Battery, in Shintō, with Type 81 and Type 93 Surface-to-air missile systems
 12th Combat Engineer Company, in Takasaki
 12th Signal Company, in Shintō
 12th Aviation Squadron, in Shintō, flying UH-60JA and CH-47J/JA helicopters
 12th NBC-defense Company, in Shintō
 12th Logistic Support Battalion, in Takasaki

note 1: Infantry Regiments have only battalion strength.

External links
 Homepage 12th Brigade (Japanese)

Japan Ground Self-Defense Force Brigade
Military units and formations established in 2001